Paul Hubbard may refer to:
 Paul Hubbard (wide receiver) (born 1985), American football wide receiver
 Paul D. Hubbard (1871–1946), American football player credited with inventing the modern huddle
 Paul Hubbard (American football coach), head football coach at Bethany College in Lindsborg, Kansas